4-PPBP is a molecule which binds to sigma receptors.

4-PPBP decreases neuronal nitric oxide synthase (nNOS) activity and ischemia-evoked nitric oxide (NO) production. 4-PPBP provides neuroprotection; this involves the prevention of ischemia-induced intracellular Ca2+dysregulation. 4-PPBP protects neurons using a mechanism that activates the transcription factor cyclic adenosine monophosphate response element-binding protein (CREB). Neuroprotection that is associated with 4-PPBP increases Bcl-2 expression; Bcl-2 expression is regulated by CREB.

See also 
 3-PPP

References 

4-Phenylpiperidines
Sigma agonists